Sugar Tree Branch is a stream in Howard County in the U.S. state of Missouri. It is a tributary of Bonne Femme Creek.

Sugar Tree Branch most likely was so named on account of sugar maple trees along its course.

See also
List of rivers of Missouri

References

Rivers of Howard County, Missouri
Rivers of Missouri